Tủa Chùa is a rural district of Điện Biên province in the Northwest region of Vietnam. As of 2003, the district had a population of 42,366. The district covers an area of 679 km². The district capital lies at Tủa Chùa.

Geography

Administrative divisions
Tua Chua has 12 administrative units, including 1 town and 11 communes:

Tủa Chùa (town)
Huổi Só
Lao Xả Phình 
Mường Báng
Mường Đun 
Sín Chải 
Sính Phình
Tả Phìn
Tả Sìn Thàng 
Trung Thu 
Tủa Thàng
Xá Nhè

References

Districts of Điện Biên province
Điện Biên province